Queen Anne in Prince George's County, Maryland, United States, is a former port on the Patuxent River. It was delineated as a CDP for the 2010 census, at which time it had a population of 1,280. Per the 2020 census, the population was 1,405.

Geography
Queen Anne is located at 38°53'55" North, 76°40'42" West (38.8987239 -76.6782992). Most of the town's former waterfront area is now part of Patuxent River Park, owned and operated by the Maryland-National Capital Park and Planning Commission. This includes hiking trails, two paddling launches, fishing locations, and an environmental education center operated by 4H. The head of tidewater on the Patuxent River is at the downstream (4H---a group not affiliated with the National 4H Club) launch site in Queen Anne.

History
The town was created in 1706 when the colonial Maryland Legislature authorized surveying and laying out the towns of Queen Anne Town, Nottingham, Mill Town, Piscataway, Aire (also known as Broad Creek) and Upper Marlboro (then known as Marlborough Town).

Queen Anne's Town was created as part of a 1706 act "for the advancement of trade and erecting ports and towns in the Province of Maryland." The town grew to a population of about 150.

In 1747, the legislature tried to improve the quality and the method of marketing tobacco, then the major crop of the area, and established a formal system of tobacco inspection and quality control. A tobacco inspection station and warehouse was located on Hazelwood, then owned by Thomas Lancaster, one of the town's leading merchants. Hazelwood Mansion, though in disrepair, stands today and is owned by the Maryland National Park and Planning Commission). This was one of seven state tobacco warehouses built in Prince George's County. A horse racing track was also built in the town.

By the mid-18th century, upland farming in the Patuxent basin without erosion control led to massive silting of the river. The ports along the Patuxent quickly filled with silt and could no longer take in ocean-going vessels such as the snows that frequented the town. The last cargo ship left for England about 1790, and the town began to decline.

During the War of 1812, the Chesapeake Bay Flotilla commanded by Joshua Barney scuttled his entire fleet in the half dozen miles of river below Queen Anne to avoid the vessels being captured by the advancing British.

Demographics

2020 census

Note: the US Census treats Hispanic/Latino as an ethnic category. This table excludes Latinos from the racial categories and assigns them to a separate category. Hispanics/Latinos can be of any race.

Queen Anne Bridge

Queen Anne Bridge, originally built in 1755, once served as a main road connecting Anne Arundel County to Prince George's County.

Renaming
In 1897 the United States Board on Geographic Names decided to change the name of Queen Anne to Hardesty to avoid confusion with the other town in Maryland named Queen Anne.
However, local usage including signage, road names, bridge names, commercial mapping, the community association name, etc. continues to reflect the Queen Anne name. For the 2010 census, the U.S. Census Bureau used the original name of "Queen Anne" in delineating a new census-designated place covering the community.

Education
Prince George's County Public Schools operates public schools serving the census-designated place.

Schools serving sections of the CDP are Pointer Ridge Elementary School, Benjamin Tasker Middle School, and Bowie High School.

References

External links

African-American Sites Along the Patuxent River

Census-designated places in Prince George's County, Maryland
Census-designated places in Maryland
1706 establishments in Maryland